Nikkei Asia, known as Nikkei Asian Review between 2013 and 2020, is a major Japan-based English-language weekly news magazine focused on the Asian continent, although it also covers broader international developments. It is headquartered in Tokyo, Japan. Nikkei Asia was originally launched in 2013.

Ownership 
Nikkei Asia is owned by Nikkei, Inc., the same Japan-based holding company that also owns the London-based Financial Times. Because Nikkei Asia and the Financial Times are sister publications, some Financial Times journalists are seconded to Nikkei Asia on a rotating, two-year basis.

Nikkei Asia calls itself the "voice of the Asian century".

References

External links
 

Magazine publishing companies of Japan